The 2012–13 OFC Champions League was the 12th edition of the Oceanian Club Championship, Oceania's premier club football tournament organized by the Oceania Football Confederation (OFC), and the 7th season under the current OFC Champions League name.

Auckland City became the first team to win three consecutive title after defeating Waitakere United in an all-New Zealand final. As the winner of the 2013 OFC Champions League, they earned the right to represent the OFC at the 2013 FIFA Club World Cup.

Format change

The OFC decided on the following format changes for the 2013 edition:
A preliminary stage was added to the tournament such that teams from all eleven OFC member associations have a chance to contest the title of O-League Champion.
Instead of kicking off in late October or early November, the group stage was played in a one-month period in March and April, and games took place every weekend, including mid-week matches.
Unlike in previous years, a semi-final stage was played and featured the two highest-placed teams in each group. These matches were played over two legs on a home-and-away basis.
The victorious semi-final teams then clashed in a winner-takes-all final at a pre-determined venue. The one-match final is a change from previous seasons, in which the final was played over two legs, home and away.

Teams
The following teams entered the competition.

Schedule
The schedule of the competition was as follows.

Matches played in Tahiti are one day behind the other countries in global time as Tahiti is on the other side of the International Date Line.

Preliminary stage
The preliminary stage matches were played in Tonga from 1 May to 8 May 2012.

Preliminary round
In the preliminary round, the four teams played each other on a round-robin basis. The group winner advanced to the play-off round.

Play-off round
In the play-off round, the winner of the preliminary round and the team entering in this round played each other over one match. The winner advanced to the group stage to join the seven automatic qualifiers.

Group stage
In the group stage, the eight teams were divided into two groups of four. In each group, the four teams played each other on a home-and-away round-robin basis. The group winners and runners-up advanced to the semi-finals.

On 5 February 2013, the OFC announced the draw and schedule of the group stage. The group stage matches were played from 30 March to 28 April 2013.

Group A

Group B

Semi-finals
In the semi-finals, the winner of Group A play the runner-up of Group B, and the winner of Group B play the runner-up of Group A. In each tie, teams play each other on a home-and-away two-legged basis, with the group winners hosting the second leg. If the aggregate score is tied after the second leg, the away goals rule is applied. If away goals are also tied, extra time is played, and the away goals rule is applied again after extra time, i.e., if there are goals scored during extra time and the aggregate score is still tied, the away team qualifies. If no goals are scored during extra time, the winner is determined by penalty shoot-out.

The first legs were played on 4 and 5 May 2013, and the second legs were played on 11 and 12 May 2013.

First leg

Second leg

Auckland City won 7–1 on aggregate and advanced to the final.

Waitakere United won 4–1 on aggregate and advanced to the final.

Final

In the final, the two semi-final winners played each other over one match at a pre-determined venue, with extra time and penalty shoot-out used to decide the winner if necessary. The final was played at Arena 2 of Mount Smart Stadium in Auckland, New Zealand on 19 May 2013.

Awards

Goalscorers

Preliminary stage
In the preliminary stage (preliminary round and play-off round), there were 37 goals in 7 matches, for an average of 5.29 goals per match.

Final stage
In the final stage (group stage, semi-finals and final), there were 95 goals in 29 matches, for an average of 3.28 per match.

See also
2013 FIFA Club World Cup

References

External links
O-League Preliminary Schedule & Results
OFC Champions League Schedule & Results

2012-13
1